William C. F. Postance (June 4, 1874 – April 14, 1953) was an American and British theatre actor, playwright, producer, director and silent film actor.

Early life and career
William C. F. Postance was born on June 4, 1874 in Great Britain. He worked as a theatre actor, playwright, producer, director and film actor. He started as a 13-year-old call boy at the Garrick Theatre. At the age of 15, Postance worked as a prompter in the production of Diplomacy to Queen Victoria. He joined Olga Nethersole in Sandou's La Tosca.

He worked as William Gillette's personal director for 13 years and worked with him for over 40 years. He helped Gillette prepare the stage adaptation of Sherlock Holmes and directed its London production. He performed before Queen Victoria, Edward VIII, William Ewart Gladstone and Woodrow Wilson. Throughout his career, he was involved in 167 plays. His last stage appearance was The Man Who Came to Dinner in 1940.

Plays
Diplomacy, as prompter
The Governor and the Boss (1909), as writer
Remember the Day
Criminal At Large
The Morals of Marcus, as director
The Richest Girl, as director
Captain Kid, as director
Robin Goodfellow, as director
Carmen, as director
Camille, as director
Gentlemen Prefer Blondes (1927), as Sir Francis Beekman
Sherlock Holmes (1930), as director and as Sidney Prince
The Admirable Crichton (1931), as director
Tea for Three (1936), as director

Films
The Iron Woman (1916)
Sherlock Holmes (1916), as Sidney Prince

Personal life
Postance died, at the age of 78, on April 14, 1953, at St. Mary's Hospital in Hoboken, New Jersey.

References

External links

Year of birth uncertain
1874 births
1953 deaths
American theatre directors
American male stage actors
20th-century American dramatists and playwrights
American male dramatists and playwrights
English theatre directors
English male stage actors
American male silent film actors
British emigrants to the United States